Kenrick is a surname, and may refer to:

 Ann Kenrick (born 1958), British charity worker
 Bruce Kenrick (1920–2007), a Minister in the United Reformed Church and the Church of Scotland 
 Francis Kenrick (1796–1863), an Irish-born clergyman of the Roman Catholic Church
 George Hamilton Kenrick, (1850–1939), an English entomologist
 Jarvis Kenrick (1852–1949), an English international footballer
  John Kenrick: various people, including:
 John Kenrick (MP) (1735–1799), MP for Bletchingley
 John Kenrick (historian) (1788–1877), 19th century classical historian
 John Kenrick (theatre writer) (b. 1959), American theatre and film historian and writer
 Llewelyn Kenrick (1847–1933), a Welsh lawyer and international footballer
 Peter Richard Kenrick (1806–1896), an Irish-born Catholic archbishop (brother of Francis)
 Timothy Kenrick (1759–1804), Welsh Unitarian minister, biblical commentator, and dissenting academy tutor
 Wilfred Byng Kenrick (1872–1962), Lord Mayor of Birmingham, son of William Kenrick (Birmingham MP)
 William Kenrick (disambiguation): various people, including:
 William Kenrick (Member of the Barebones Parliament), MP for Kent (UK Parliament constituency)
 William Kenrick (Birmingham MP) (1831–1919), an English iron founder, hardware manufacturer and Liberal politician (cousin of Llewelyn)
 William Kenrick (1774–1829), English MP for Bletchingley 1806–14, Master of the King's Household 1810–12
 William Kenrick (nurseryman) (1795–1872), an American nurseryman
 William Kenrick (writer) (c.1725–1779), an English novelist, playwright, translator and satirist

As a first name
Kenrick Edisbury, MP

See also 
 Kendrick (disambiguation)